Bléquin is a commune in the Pas-de-Calais department in the Hauts-de-France region in northern France.

Geography
A village situated 15 miles (24 km) southwest of Saint-Omer, on theD202 road.

Population

Sights
 The nineteenth-century church of St. Omer.
 The ruins of a 13th-century chateau.

See also
Communes of the Pas-de-Calais department

References

Communes of Pas-de-Calais